Bryan Philip Robinson (born January 25, 1986) is a professional gridiron football defensive tackle. He was signed by the Arizona Cardinals as an undrafted free agent in 2008. He played college football at Wesley College.

Robinson has also been a member of the Hamilton Tiger-Cats and New York Sentinels. He is currently a free agent.

Professional career

Philadelphia Soul
Robinson signed with the Philadelphia Soul for the 2012 season. In his first season with the Soul, Robinson had his best arena season, breaking the Soul record for tackles for loss, earning him 2nd Team All-Arena honors. After re-signing with the Soul for 2013, Robinson had yet another outstanding season for the Soul, Robinson finished 5th in the AFL in sacks with 11, and broke his own Soul record for tackles for loss with (17.5). Robinson returned to the Soul in 2015.

References

External links
Arizona Cardinals bio
United Football League bio

1986 births
Living people
People from Harrington, Delaware
Players of American football from Delaware
American football defensive tackles
Canadian football defensive linemen
American players of Canadian football
Wesley Wolverines football players
Arizona Cardinals players
Manchester Wolves players
Hamilton Tiger-Cats players
New York Sentinels players
Milwaukee Iron players
Cleveland Gladiators players
Kansas City Command players
Philadelphia Soul players